Ganj Aliabad may refer to:

Ganj Aliabad-e Olya
Ganj Aliabad-e Sofla